Gulkada (Pashto: ،ګلکده) is an administrative unit, known as Union council in Tehsil Babuzai, or Wards of Swat District in the Khyber Pakhtunkhwa province of Pakistan.

According to Khyber Pakhtunkhwa Local Government Act 2013. District Swat has 67 Wards, of which total amount of Village Councils is 170, and Neighbourhood Councils is 44.

Gulkada is Territorial  Ward, which is further divided in three Neighbourhood Councils:
 Panr (Neighbourhood Council)
 Gulkada (Neighbourhood Council)
 College Colony (Neighbourhood Council)

Panr: Panr is one of the important areas of Union council Gulkada. During the Local Bodies Elections, Mr. Riaz Khan, Awami National Party (Resident of Panr) elected as Nazim and served the people of the Union Council Gulkada.

See also 
 Babuzai
 Swat District

References

External links
Khyber-Pakhtunkhwa Government website section on Lower Dir
United Nations
Hajjinfo.org Uploads
 PBS paiman.jsi.com 

Swat District
Populated places in Swat District
Union councils of Khyber Pakhtunkhwa
Union Councils of Swat District